The Volksraad was a people's assembly or legislature in Dutch or Afrikaans speaking government.

Assembly

South Africa
Volksraad (South African Republic) (1840–1902)
Volksraad (Natalia Republic), a similar assembly that existed in the Natalia Republic
Volksraad (Orange Free State), a similar assembly that existed in the Orange Free State until 1902
 , the Afrikaans name for the House of Assembly (South Africa) (1910–1994)

Indonesia
Volksraad (Dutch East Indies), a consultative council for the Dutch East Indies established in 1918
Volksraad, a consultative council for Dutch New Guinea (1949–1969)

Other uses
Volksraad (horse), a New Zealand sire of racehorses

